This page documents all tornadoes confirmed by various weather forecast offices of the National Weather Service in the United States during November to December 2018. Tornado counts are considered preliminary until final publication in the database of the National Centers for Environmental Information.

United States yearly total

November

November 1 event

November 2 event

November 5 event

November 6 event

November 7 event

November 12 event

November 13 event

November 24 event

November 30 event

December

December 1 event

December 2 event

December 3 event

December 9 event

December 18 event

December 20 event

December 26 event

December 27 event

December 31 event

See also
 Tornadoes of 2018
 List of United States tornadoes from August to October 2018
 List of United States tornadoes from January to February 2019

Notes

References

2018 natural disasters in the United States
2018-related lists
Tornadoes of 2018
Tornadoes
2018, 11